Marijuana Myths, Marijuana Facts: A Review of the Scientific Evidence is a 1997 book about the medical effects of cannabis, and related U.S. drug control policy, written by Lynn Zimmer and John P. Morgan. , Zimmer was a sociology professor at Queens College. Morgan was a professor of pharmacology at City University of New York Medical School when he wrote the book; he was on the National Organization for the Reform of Marijuana Laws (NORML) board of directors from 1996 until 2005 and "published approximately 100 articles, book chapters and books, largely focused on the clinical pharmacology of psychoactive drugs" by the time of his death in 2008.

Content
Recognizing marijuana is here to stay, the book provides reliable information about marijuana's effects on people. The authors recognize that marijuana policies and personal decisions about marijuana use should be based on scientific evidence, factual information, and common sense. The review of claims about marijuana and the latest scientific evidence about marijuana's effects leads the authors to conclude that, while heavy marijuana use can be harmful, marijuana use, in general, is not nearly as harmful as the myths about marijuana claim. Despite the criminalization of marijuana in the United States and the massive efforts embodied by the war on drugs, more adolescents were trying marijuana in the 1990s. The myths covered include many individual medical, criminological or sociological claims that can be examined scientifically:

Medical

Marijuana has no medical value
Marijuana is highly addictive
Marijuana is a gateway drug
Marijuana  kills brain cells
Marijuana causes amotivational syndrome
Marijuana impairs memory and cognition
Marijuana causes psychological impairment
Marijuana interferes with male and female sex hormones
Marijuana use during pregnancy damages the fetus
Marijuana impairs the immune system
Marijuana is more damaging to the lungs than tobacco
Marijuana gets trapped in body fat
Marijuana-related hospital emergencies are increasing

Criminological or sociological

Marijuana offenses are not severely punished
Marijuana policy in the Netherlands is a failure
Marijuana causes crime
Marijuana use before or while driving is a major cause of highway accidents
Marijuana is more potent today than in the past
Marijuana use can be prevented

Reception
A review in the Journal of Psychoactive Drugs stated "There are many strongly held beliefs – here mostly exposed as myths – about marijuana, and such beliefs cover the gamut of scientific, clinical, psychological, social, criminological and other issues. The book's chapters thus address issues of marijuana's real or putative effects on sex hormones and reproduction, lungs, the immune system, the brain, memory, cognition and motivation; the gateway theory and addiction; crime, deviance and punishment, and so on -- in other words, virtually all the concerns that have been raised for decades in varying form... an issue-by-issue refutation of many of the positions often taken for granted by government, educational institutions, and even some professional organizations... the final chapter presents a whirlwind skeptic's tour through recent decades of governmental and public hysteria, misinformation and other follies..."

A review in the Journal of the American Medical Association stated "Zimmer and Morgan provide an extraordinarily well-researched and passionately argued book on the biomedical and sociological issues raised in today's debate about marijuana. In their desire to 'set the record straight', however, they sometimes sacrifice even-handedness for impact."

The Reason magazine obituary of co-author John P. Morgan M.D. stated that the book had "concisely and authoritatively debunked the major themes of anti-pot [cannabis] propaganda".

See also
 List of books about cannabis

Footnotes

References

Further reading

External links

Full text of book at Internet Archive

1997 non-fiction books
American non-fiction books
Books about politics of the United States
Non-fiction books about cannabis